The Small Change trilogy is a series of alternate history novels by the author Jo Walton that were published from 2006 to 2008. The series are set in a Europe in which the United Kingdom exits World War II in 1941. As the series begins, Britain itself slides toward fascism. The series has three books:

 Farthing  Tor Books August 8, 2006,  
 Ha'penny, Tor Books; Reprint edition July 1, 2008,  
 Half a Crown, Tor Books; September 30, 2008, 

The short story, "Escape to Other Worlds with Science Fiction," is set in the United States of the same world as the Small Change trilogy

Alternate history book series
Novels by Jo Walton
Science fiction novel series